The 2019 Cadel Evans Great Ocean Road Race was a road cycling one-day race that took place on 27 January 2019 in Geelong, Australia. It was the fifth edition of the Cadel Evans Great Ocean Road Race and the second event of the 2019 UCI World Tour.

2018 runner-up Elia Viviani, from Italy, improved upon that position, as the  rider led home a 33-rider group at the finish to take the victory, ahead of the highest-placed Australian rider Caleb Ewan.

Teams
As the race was only added to the UCI World Tour calendar in 2017, all UCI WorldTeams were invited to the race, but not obligated to compete in the race. As such, fifteen of the eighteen WorldTeams competed in the race, up three on 2018. An Australian national squad completed the 16-team peloton, therefore no UCI Professional Continental teams competed for the first time.

Result

References

External links
 

Cadel Evans Great Ocean Road Race
Cadel Evans Great Ocean Road Race
Cadel Evans Great Ocean Road Race
Cadel Evans Great Ocean Road Race